Qizhou or Qi Prefecture (蘄州) was a zhou (prefecture) in imperial China centering on modern Qichun County, Hubei, China. In the Yuan dynasty and Ming dynasty it was known as Qizhou Prefecture (蘄州路 or 蘄州府). It existed from the 6th century until 1912.

References
 

Prefectures of the Sui dynasty
Prefectures of the Tang dynasty
Prefectures of Yang Wu
Prefectures of Southern Tang
Prefectures of the Song dynasty
Prefectures of the Yuan dynasty
Prefectures of the Ming dynasty
Prefectures of the Qing dynasty
Former prefectures in Hubei
Prefectures of Later Zhou